Gathuthuma is a settlement in Kenya's Central Province.

References 

Populated places in Central Province (Kenya)